Lorna Regina "Loren" Bautista Legarda (born January 28, 1960) is a Filipina politician, environmentalist, cultural worker, and former journalist who is currently serving as a Senator and the president pro tempore of the Senate of the Philippines since 2022. Before entering politics, she began her career as a news reporter until becoming a news anchor. She previously served three terms in the Senate from 1998 to 2004 and from 2007 to 2019. She is the longest-serving female Senator in the history of the Senate, and the only female in the Philippines to top two senatorial elections: 1998 and 2007. Legarda was also the House Deputy Speaker during her three-year stint as the representative of Antique from 2019 to 2022.
 
Legarda ran for vice president in 2004 as the running mate of Fernando Poe Jr., but controversially lost to Noli De Castro, Legarda contested the result on an electoral protest where she also lost. She failed short again vying the same position in 2010 as the running mate of Manny Villar.

Legarda is an advocate of climate change awareness and has numerous achievements in the fields of social development and human rights advocacy along with her work in journalism.  Her legislative work is focused on education, indigenous people rights, culture, women's rights, children's rights, and the environment. Some the notable laws she authored and co-authored include the Climate Change Act, Clean Water Act, Renewable Energy Act, Magna Carta of Women, Anti-Domestic Violence Act, National Cultural Heritage Act, Responsible Parenthood and Reproductive Health Act of 2012, the Universal Access to Quality Tertiary Education Act, and the Universal Healthcare Law. Alongside her legislative work, she has also represented the Philippines to UNESCO multiple times. In 2018, Legarda became a Commissioner of the newly formed international organization, Global Commission on Adaptation (GCA). She also chaired the Climate Vulnerable Forum, which encompasses 20 climate vulnerable countries.

For her environmental work, Legarda has received numerous accolades; she was awarded 2001 UNEP Laureate as declared by the United Nations Environment Programme, a 2008 Regional Champion for Disaster Risk Reduction and Climate Change Adaptation for Asia and the Pacific as declared by the United Nations International Strategy for Disaster Reduction, a National Adaptation Plan (NAP) Champion by the United Nations Framework Convention on Climate Change in 2017. She was declared by the United Nations as a UN Global Champion for Resilience in 2015. She was the 2016 recipient of the prestigious Dangal ng Haraya Patron of Arts and Culture. She has been named as honorary princess and member by numerous indigenous people communities in the Philippines due to her support for indigenous people's rights since the 1970s.   She was honored as a Chevalier in France and Cavaliere in Italy.

Early life
Loren Legarda was born on January 28, 1960, in Malabon (then a municipality in Rizal) as Lorna Regina Bautista Legarda, the only daughter of Antonio Cabrera Legarda and Maria Salome Basilia "Bessie" Gella Bautista. Her maternal grandfather was Jose P. Bautista, editor-in-chief of the pre-Martial Law newspaper, The Manila Times, while her maternal grandmother was Carmen Gella Bautista of Pandan, Antique. Legarda's maternal great-grandfather, Ariston Rendon Gella, was a member of the Malolos Congress that crafted the Philippine Constitution of the First Philippine Republic. Her great-granduncle Vicente Gella was governor of the province while her great-granduncle was mayor of Sibalom. A brother of her grandfather, Bartolome Gella, also served as governor of Antique.

As a teenager, she appeared as a print and television model. She attended Assumption College from primary to high school, where she was a grade school valedictorian. She graduated cum laude from the University of the Philippines Diliman in 1981 with a bachelor's degree in broadcast communications and was President of the UP Broadcast Association. She pursued post-graduate courses on special studies towards professional designation in journalism from the University of California, Los Angeles.

Career in journalism
Legarda began a career in journalism as a reporter for RPN, during which she covered topics including Imelda Marcos' trip to Kenya and the People Power Revolution. During this period, she obtained a master's degree in National Security Administration from the National Defense College of the Philippines, graduating at the top of the class with gold medals for Academic Excellence and Best Thesis. Later, she would move to the reopened ABS-CBN. She became the co-anchor of the television newscast, The World Tonight with Angelo Castro, Jr., and became the host of the current affairs series, The Inside Story.

As a journalist, Loren earned the Gawad Cultural Center of the Philippines, Catholic Mass Media Hall of Fame, Kapisanan ng mga Brodkaster ng Pilipinas Golden Dove Award, Ten Outstanding Young Men (TOYM) from the Philippine Jaycees (1992), The Outstanding Women in the Nation's Service (TOWNS) Award (1995), and the Benigno Aquino Award for Journalism (1995), among more than 30 awards.

Political career

1998 Senate bid, first term
Legarda ran for the Senate in 1998 under the Lakas-NUCD-UMDP Party. She was elected with more than 15 million votes, rendering her the highest number of votes in that year's election and becoming the second woman to top a Philippine senatorial election. Upon Legarda filing her candidacy as senator in late 1997, Tina Monzon-Palma who came from rival ABC (now TV5) and was the anchor of The Big News, transferred to ABS-CBN in order to replace her on The World Tonight at the same time and joining Angelo Castro, Jr. in order to run the latter for this election. In 1999, the newscast was replaced by Pulso: Aksyon Balita on ABS-CBN and was moved to the ABS-CBN News Channel, where it has aired since.

During her first six years in the Senate, Legarda authored legislation benefiting women's and children's rights, such as the Anti-Domestic Violence Act which seeks to uphold and protect the basic human rights of women and their children, the Anti-Child Labor law which limits the employment of children below 15 years old, the Anti-Trafficking in Persons Act which aims to protect victims of human trafficking, the Ecological Solid Waste Management Law which created the National Solid Waste Management Commission, and the Tropical Fabric Law. She also authored the Eid'ul Fitr Holiday Law, Overseas Absentee Voting Act of 2003, and the Philippine Ear Research Institute Act.

Legarda was named as one of the "Global Leaders for Tomorrow" by the World Economic Forum in Davos, Switzerland in 2000, and was awarded by the United Nations Environmental Program (UNEP) in Turin, Italy, for her work on the environment in 2001. Legarda played a role in the 2000–01 impeachment trial of Joseph Estrada that sparked the Second EDSA Revolution, voting to examine the envelope containing evidence of alleged corruption of the Estrada administration. She was later chosen to be the Senate's Majority Floor Leader from 2001 to 2004, becoming the first woman to hold the position.

2004 vice presidential bid

In 2003, Legarda left Lakas–CMD (after Gloria Macapagal Arroyo broke her pledge not to run again for president) and joined the Koalisyon ng Nagkakaisang Pilipino coalition of Fernando Poe, Jr. as an Independent during the 2004 elections. She lost the election to Noli de Castro, the running mate of Arroyo, under a narrow margin of 3.9%.

On January 18, 2008, in a 21-page resolution, penned by Senior Justice Leonardo Quisumbing, the Supreme Court of the Philippines, acting as the Presidential Electoral Tribunal (PET), dismissed Legarda's electoral protest against de Castro.

2007 Senate bid, second term
In 2007, Legarda decided to run again for Senate under the banner of the Genuine Opposition coalition. She won, receiving more than 18 million votes, which allowed her to become the top vote-getter in that election. In her second term as senator, Legarda authored the Expanded Senior Citizens Law, the Climate Change Act, Clean Air Act, Renewable Energy Act, the Magna Carta for Micro, Small and Medium Enterprises (MSME) Act, Barangay Kabuhayan Act, the Magna Carta on Women, University of the Philippines Charter of 2008, Bacolor Rehabilitation Council Act, Tourism Act of 2009, Universal Newborn Hearing Screening and Intervention Act of 2009, Food and Drug Administration Act of 2009, and the Cheaper and Quality Medicines Act. The Climate Change Act was lauded by the United Nations as the 'best in the world'. She co-authored the National Cultural Heritage Act. Aside from her legislative work, she also established the Luntiang Pilipinas (Green Philippines) foundation, an organization aimed to aid the Philippines in attaining its United Nations mandate for reforestation, where the target was set by the UN at 2009.

In 2008, she was chosen as "United Nations International Strategy for Disaster Reduction Asia Pacific Regional Champion for Disaster Risk Reduction and Climate Change Adaptation", and she participated in the Global Platform on Disaster Risk Reduction, the BBC World Debate: ‘Prevent or React’, and the Forum on the Human Impact of Climate Change in Geneva, Switzerland. In October 2009, the Climate Change Act was passed. She filed this bill two years ago, citing inspiration from the Albay Declaration, the outcome document of the First National Conference on Climate Change Adaptation, as it called for “the passage of a policy prioritizing climate change adaptation in the national agenda”. She was a member of the Philippine delegation during the 2009 Copenhagen Summit.

2010 vice presidential bid

On July 14, 2009, Legarda expressed her interest to run as president during the 2010 elections. On October 23, 2009, during the launch of her humanitarian program "Lingkod Loren in Luneta", she formally declared her intention to run for vice president in 2010 under Nationalist People's Coalition with the platform of environmentalism. After Francis Escudero, expected to run for president, left the NPC, she decided that it would be best to stick with the Nacionalista Party's presidential candidate, Manny Villar, as a guest-running mate.

Legarda lost her bid for the Philippine vice presidency to Jejomar Binay, placing third in the 2010 Philippine presidential elections. As a result, she continued her term in the Senate. In 2010, Legarda was given chairmanship for the Senate committees on climate change, cultural communities, and foreign affairs. She would later go to the United Nations to deposit the Philippines ratification for the International Criminal Court membership. As a result of Koko Pimentel's win in his case against Juan Miguel Zubiri, Legarda requested the Supreme Court to allow them to retrieve documents that they submitted as evidence for her electoral protest against de Castro for the reopening of the investigation of electoral cheating in the 2004 and 2007 elections.

2013 Senate bid, third term
Legarda was reelected during the 2013 elections, garnering the second highest number of votes among the 12 winning senators. During her third term, she focused on much legislative push for various cultural and environmental bills in the Senate. She also chaired the Senate Committee on Environment and Natural Resource and the Senate Committee on Finance. Legarda reportedly persuaded former Environment Secretary Gina Lopez to accept the post she was given as she believed and knew Lopez's strong management and implementing skills in environmental conservation. Legarda was one of only 8 lawmakers who were in favor of Gina Lopez retaining the environment secretary post during her confirmation hearing which ousted Lopez from her position. She was unable to enter her vote of support or dissent on a Senate resolution which sought to condemn the controversial burial of the late dictator Ferdinand Marcos in the Libingan ng mga Bayani in November 2016. She was among the 14 senators who filed a resolution urging the Supreme Court to review its ouster decision in regards to the quo warranto petition against Maria Lourdes Sereno. She spearheaded in the Senate the ratification of more than 10 international treaties.

Legarda continued her environmental work. Environmental bills she filed included the Total Logging Ban bill which aimed to ban logging for 25 years; the International Disaster Relief and Initial Recovery Assistance bill; a bill establishing the Department of Fisheries, Low Carbon Economy bill, Energy Efficiency and Conservation bill, Final Forest Limits bill, National Land Use Act of the Philippines, Expanded NIPAS Act, People's Survival Fund Act, Water Sector Reform bill, and a bill creating the Department of Housing and Urban Development, among others. She also led the investigation on the environmental crisis in Boracay.

She was awarded as a United Nations Global Champion for Resilience in 2015 due to her advocacy and actions on climate change and environmentalism. In November 2017, she led the Philippine delegation at the 23rd UN Climate Change Conference (COP23) in Bonn, Germany. She was named the first ever National Adaptation Plan (NAP) Champion during the event as mandated by an international treaty ratified by the UNFCCC. Legarda became part of a special Philippine delegation to the French Senate to discuss about the Paris Agreement under the United Nations Framework Convention on Climate Change (UNFCCC) dealing with greenhouse gas emissions mitigation, adaptation and finance starting in the year 2020. She was named Chevalier (Knight) in the Ordre national de la légion d’Honneur (National Order of the French Legion of Order) by the government of France. 

She also focused on the enhancement of Philippine culture and the arts. Her legislative work included the National Writing Systems Bill, which aimed to institutionalize baybayin and other indigenous writing systems as national writing systems and the National Cultural Heritage Act. Legarda pushed for the creation of the Department of Culture and the Arts. On February 7, 2019 a bill which safeguards the 1,446 Gabaldon school heritage buildings of the country, authored by Legarda, was enacted into law. She also spearheaded the return of the Philippines to the Venice Bienniale, the most acclaimed art exposition in the world, after 5 decades of Philippine absence in the exhibitions.

Legarda also filed various indigenous people rights, culture, women's rights, and children's rights bills. These included the Traditional Property Rights of Indigenous People bill,  Indigenous Community Conserved Areas Act, Magna Carta for the Poor bill, Anti-Hazing Law of 2018, and the Anti-Discrimination Bill. Legarda backed the passage of the SOGIE Equality Bill in the Senate. She led the Philippine delegation to the United Nations and urged tougher global actions against cybersex and child trafficking. She supported the Philippine Drug War of President Rodrigo Duterte, but said that she does not support the police killings of innocent citizens.

Other bills she filed included a bill to mandate the government to use the Gross Happiness Index used by Bhutan, the Freedom of Information bill (FOI) Philippine Innovation Bill, Solo Parent's Welfare bill, War Veterans Reform Bill, Magna Carta for Public School Teachers, Philippine Academic Regalia Act, Domestic Workers Act, and the Election Service Reform bill. She also authored the General Appropriations Act of 2017 and 2018. She co-authored the Philippine Mental Health Law, HIV and AIDS Policy Act of 2018, Responsible Parenthood and Reproductive Health Act of 2012, and the Universal Access to Quality Tertiary Education Act. She also sponsored the Delimitation of the Exclusive Economic Zone Boundary agreement between the Philippines and Indonesia, which led to its ratification. 

She pursued greater public awareness and public cooperation for the National Museum of the Philippines, National Library of the Philippines, Komisyon ng Wikang Filipino, Cultural Center of the Philippines, the country's own culture and arts commission, indigenous communities in the country, Philippines heritage conservation and restoration, intangible cultural heritage of the country, indigenous Philippine weaving, greater appreciation of Philippine and international art, and support for UNESCO initiatives, including the possible nomination of the Manila-Acapulco Galleon Trade Route to the UNESCO World Heritage List. She also supported the restoration of megalithic churches that were destroyed or damaged by the 2013 Bohol earthquake which affected Central Visayas. The restoration was governed by the National Museum of the Philippines with aid from her office. A number of churches that were affected were in the Tentative List for UNESCO World Heritage Sites. On the same year, she led the Philippine delegation group for UNESCO, and was greeted by UNESCO Secretary-General Irina Bokova. On October 16, 2019, Legarda became a Commissioner of the newly formed international organization, Global Commission on Adaptation (GCA).

Legarda also initiated and pushed for her home province of Antique's hosting of the 2017 Palarong Pambansa, the national games of the Philippines. It was the first time Antique hosted the games. The effects on the province was notable as tourists from all over the country flocked Antique's heritages sites, including the Antique Rice Terraces and the weaving centrums of the province. She led the first ever churchyard orchestra in her home province of Antique and the unveiling of the first ever Language Monument in the Philippines.

2019 House of Representatives bid, first term

On October 18, Legarda announced that she will run as congresswoman of the lone district of Antique in Western Visayas in the 2019 Philippine elections. Her congressional run went to the court after a local politician argued against her candidacy. On February 6, 2019, the courts officially allowed Legarda to run for congresswoman of Antique province. Legarda was elected as the new congresswoman and representative of the province and district of Antique after the May 2019 elections, where she received a landslide victory against a political dynasty. She assumed the position on July 1, 2019.

2022 Senate bid, fourth term
On October 1, 2021, she filed her certificate of candidacy to run for senator. She is running under the Nationalist People's Coalition, and is part of the Reporma-NPC slate, MP3 Alliance slate, and the UniTeam slate.  She won the elections placing 2nd with 24,264,969 votes behind Robin Padilla and was proclaimed on May 18, 2022. 

She assumed office on June 30, 2022. On July 25, 2022, she was named Senate President pro tempore.Legarda is also the Chairperson of the Senate Committee on Culture and the Arts.

Organizational affiliations
 Commissioner, Global Commission on Adaptation (2018)
 Member, Women in Parliaments (WIP) Global Forum Executive Board (2016)
 Co-Chair, Global Legislators Organisation for a Balanced Environment (GLOBE) Philippines
 Senior Advisor, Ocean Security International (2013)
 Founding Member, Global Advisory Group of Parliamentarians on Disaster Risk Reduction (2012)
 Founding Chair, Asia Pacific Institute for Green Development (2011)
 Founder, Luntiang Pilipinas (1998)
 Founder, Libro ni Loren Foundation (1999)
 Member, Phi Kappa Phi International Honor Society

Accolades

1992 Ten Outstanding Young Men (TOYM) from the Philippine Jaycees
1995 The Outstanding Women in the Nation's Service (TOWNS) Award
1995 Benigno Aquino Award for Journalism
2000 Global Leaders for Tomorrow by the World Economic Forum
2001 UNEP Laureate by the United Nations Environment Programme
2001 Global 500 Roll of Honor by the United Nations Environment Programme
2004 Awardee for the Environment by the Priyadarshni Academy in Mumbai, India
2008 Regional Champion for Disaster Risk Reduction and Climate Change Adaption for Asia and the Pacific by the United Nations International Strategy for Disaster Reduction
"Bai a labi" (Honorary Muslim Princess) by the Marawi Sultanate League
"Tukwifi" (Bright Star) by the Mountain Province Indigenous Peoples
"Bai Matumpis" (The One Who Takes Care) by the unified congregation of 10 Davao indigenous people groups
"Cuyong Adlaw Dulpa-an Labaw sa Kadunggan" (Shining Sun Rising in Power) by the Suludnon Indigenous Peoples of Panay
2013 Distinguished Alumna for Environmental Protection and Climate Change Adaptation of the University of the Philippines
2015 Global Champion for Resilience by the United Nations International Strategy for Disaster Reduction
Chevalier (Knight) in the Ordre national de la légion d’Honneur (National Order of the French Legion of Honor)
Cavaliere (Knight) of the Italian Order of Merit
2016 Dangal ng Haraya Patron of Arts and Culture by the National Commission for Culture and the Arts
2017 National Adaptation Plan (NAP) Champion by the United Nations Framework Convention on Climate Change
2018 Honorary degree of Doctor of Laws, Honoris Causa by the University of the Philippines
2019 Award of Distinction by the European Union
Additionally, Legarda has garnered more than 30 awards on the field of journalism since the 1980s.

Personal life
Legarda has residences in Malabon (her paternal hometown) in Metro Manila and in Pandan, Antique (her maternal hometown) in Western Visayas.

In 1989, Legarda married former Batangas Governor Antonio Leviste. Their marriage produced two sons: Lorenzo "Lanz" Leviste and Leandro "Lean" Leviste, founder and president of Solar Philippines, a manufacturer and producer of renewable energy technologies. Legarda and Leviste separated in 2003 and their marriage was annulled in 2008. On May 4, 2022, her son, Lorenzo, disowned her through an open letter in response to her decision to run as a guest candidate under the Marcos-Duterte senatorial slate in the 2022 elections. Lorenzo, who had been living in the United States since he was 18 years old, stated that he was "absolutely disgusted" by her, and condemned her for joining Marcos' slate. Her younger son, Leandro, would later publish his own letter in support of Legarda. 

She is a Colonel in the Philippine Air Force Reserve Corps. The Marawi Sultanate League bestowed the honorary title of "Bai Alabi" ("Princess") on her. The people of Mountain Province in the Cordillera Mountains gave her the name, "Tukwifi" (Bright Star). Ten indigenous groups in the Davao Region bestowed her the title of "Bai Matumpis", which means "the one who takes care". The indigenous people of Panay in the Visayas declared her a “daughter of Panay-Bukidnon” and bestowed her the name, "Cuyong Adlaw Dulpa-an Labaw sa Kadunggan" (Shining Sun Rising in Power). She is known to be very fond of traditional Philippine textiles, and has started the usage trend of such textiles in the halls of Congress. Legarda is also an organic eater, growing the vegetables, fruits, and grains that she eats at her backyard.

Legarda is an environmentalist. She established the Luntiang Pilipinas (Green Philippines) foundation. In December 2017, Legarda and director Brillante Mendoza partnered again for a documentary regarding the environment. The series, entitled, "Our Fragile Earth: Protected Areas of the Philippines," began airing in ANC on December 8. It was the first ever documentary series focused on the protected areas of the Philippines. The series features the Camotes Island Mangrove Swamp Forest Reserve, El Nido Managed Resource Protected Area, Puerto Princesa Subterranean River National Park (UNESCO World Heritage Site), Sagay Marine Reserve, Mounts Banahaw–San Cristobal Protected Landscape, Rasa Island Wildlife Sanctuary, Coron Island, Mount Hamiguitan (UNESCO World Heritage Site), and Lake Sebu, which is part of the Allah Valley Protected Landscape. The series also features the Banaue Rice Terraces, which is a UNESCO World Heritage Site, and the Verde Island Passage.

She is also the presenter of Dayaw, a 6-part series about Philippine heritage and culture. The show has been given a continuous series annually. In January 2018, the fourth season of Dayaw premiered in ANC, while a separate show dedicated to Filipino cuisine and raw ingredients is being planned for a later showing. In February 2018, Legarda and the NCCA launched the Buhay na Buhay television series which focused on eight living sub-cultures of Filipino culture.

References

External links
 Luntiang Pilipinas

1960 births
Karay-a people
Filipino environmentalists
Filipino feminists
Filipino human rights activists
Filipino Roman Catholics
Filipino television news anchors
Lakas–CMD (1991) politicians
Filipino LGBT rights activists
Living people
Chevaliers of the Légion d'honneur
Majority leaders of the Senate of the Philippines
Nationalist People's Coalition politicians
People from Batangas
People from Malabon
Presidents pro tempore of the Senate of the Philippines
Candidates in the 2010 Philippine vice-presidential election
Candidates in the 2004 Philippine vice-presidential election
Senators of the 11th Congress of the Philippines
Senators of the 12th Congress of the Philippines
Senators of the 14th Congress of the Philippines
Senators of the 15th Congress of the Philippines
Senators of the 16th Congress of the Philippines
Senators of the 17th Congress of the Philippines
University of the Philippines alumni
ABS-CBN News and Current Affairs people
RPN News and Public Affairs people
20th-century Filipino women politicians
20th-century Filipino politicians
21st-century Filipino women politicians
21st-century Filipino politicians
Women members of the Senate of the Philippines
Women television journalists
Members of the House of Representatives of the Philippines from Antique (province)
Deputy Speakers of the House of Representatives of the Philippines
Senators of the 19th Congress of the Philippines